Buwaneka Aluwihare PC is a Sri Lankan judge and lawyer. He is a sitting judge of the Supreme Court of Sri Lanka and Justice of Appeal of the Supreme Court of Fiji. Prior to his appointment as Puisne Justice of the Supreme Court of Sri Lanka, he served as a Deputy Solicitor General of the Attorney General's Department. He was sworn in by the President Mahinda Rajapaksa at Temple Trees. He has also served as a prosecutor for the UN's Serious Crimes Investigation Unit. Aluwihare worked as a prosecutor for the United Nations East Timor war crimes tribunal. In 2015 he was also appointed to the Justice of Appeal of the Supreme Court of Fiji.

References

Puisne Justices of the Supreme Court of Sri Lanka
Sinhalese judges
20th-century Sri Lankan people
21st-century Sri Lankan people
Living people
Alumni of the University of London
Sri Lankan judges on the courts of Fiji
Supreme Court of Fiji justices
Special Panels of the Dili District Court prosecutors
Year of birth missing (living people)